Histo-blood group ABO system transferase is an enzyme with glycosyltransferase activity, which is encoded by the ABO gene in humans. It is ubiquitously expressed in many tissues and cell types. ABO determines the ABO blood group of an individual by modifying the oligosaccharides on cell surface glycoproteins. Variations in the sequence of the protein between individuals determine the type of modification and the blood group. The ABO gene also contains one of 27 SNPs associated with increased risk of coronary artery disease.

Alleles 

The ABO gene resides on chromosome 9 at the band 9q34.2 and contains 7 exons. The ABO locus encodes three alleles, that is, 3 variants of the same gene. One allele is derived from each parent. 

The A allele produces α-1,3-N-acetylgalactosamine transferase (A-transferase), which catalyzes the transfer of GalNAc residues from the UDP-GalNAc donor nucleotide to the Gal residues of the acceptor H antigen, converting the H antigen into A antigen in A and AB individuals.

The B allele encodes α-1,3-galactosyl transferase (B-transferase), which catalyzes the transfer of Gal residues from the UDP-Gal donor nucleotide to the Gal residues of the acceptor H antigen, converting the H antigen into B antigen in B and AB individuals. Remarkably, the difference between the A and B glycosyltransferase enzymes is only four amino acids.

The O allele lacks both enzymatic activities because of the frameshift caused by a deletion of guanine-258 in the gene which corresponds to a region near the N-terminus of the protein. This results in a frameshift and thus of a truncated protein of only 117 amino acids. The truncated protein is unable to modify oligosaccharides which end in fucose linked to galactose. Thus no A or B antigen is found in O individuals. This sugar combination is termed the H antigen. These antigens play an important role in the match of blood transfusion and organ transplantation. Other minor alleles have been found for this gene.

Common alleles 

There are six common alleles in individuals of European descent. Nearly every living human's phenotype for the ABO gene is some combination of just these six alleles:

A
A101 (A1)
A201 (A2)
B
B101 (B1)
O
O01 (O1)
O02 (O1v)
O03 (O2)

Many rare variants of these alleles have been found in human populations around the world.

Clinical significance 

In human cells, the ABO alleles and their encoded glycosyltransferases have been described in several oncologic conditions. Using anti-GTA/GTB monoclonal antibodies, it was demonstrated that a loss of these enzymes was correlated to malignant bladder and oral epithelia. Furthermore, the expression of ABO blood group antigens in normal human tissues is dependent upon the type of differentiation of the epithelium. In most human carcinomas, including oral carcinoma, a significant event as part of the underlying mechanism is decreased expression of the A and B antigens. Several studies have observed that a relative down-regulation of GTA and GTB occurs in oral carcinomas in association with tumor development. More recently, a genome wide association study (GWAS) has identified variants in the ABO locus associated with susceptibility to pancreatic cancer.

Clinical marker 
A multi-locus genetic risk score study based on a combination of 27 loci, including the ABO gene, identified individuals at increased risk for both incident and recurrent coronary artery disease events, as well as an enhanced clinical benefit from statin therapy. The study was based on a community cohort study (the Malmo Diet and Cancer study) and four additional randomized controlled trials of primary prevention cohorts (JUPITER and ASCOT) and secondary prevention cohorts (CARE and PROVE IT-TIMI 22).

References

Further reading

See also
 RHD (gene)

External links